Ferdinand Karewski (5 November 1858 – 31 October 1923) was a German surgeon born in Stettin.

He studied medicine in Berlin, where one of his instructors was James Israel (1848–1926). He worked as a surgeon at the Jewish Hospital (Jüdischen Krankenhaus) in Berlin as an assistant, and later as director of the policlinic. He is remembered for experiments involving the effects of puerperal secretions.

Selected publications 
 Untersuchung über die Einwirkung auf den puerperaler Secrete thierischen organismus, (1882)
 Die chirurgischen Krankheiten des Kindesalters, (1894)

References 
 Pagel: Biographical Dictionary (biography of Ferdinand Karewski)

German surgeons
Physicians from Szczecin
1858 births
1923 deaths
People from the Province of Pomerania